The Roman Catholic Diocese of Kibungo is an ecclesiastical territory or diocese of the Catholic Church in Rwanda. It was erected on 5 September 1968 by Pope John XXIII. The diocese is a suffragan of the Archdiocese of Kigali.

Bishops

Ordinaries
 Joseph Sibomana (5 September 1969 – 30 March 1992)
 Frédéric Rubwejanga (30 March 1992 – 28 August 2007)
 Kizito Bahujimihigo (28 August 2007 – 29 January 2010)
 Antoine Kambanda (7 May 2013 – 19 November 2018), appointed Archbishop of Kigali
 Jean-Marie Vianney Twagirayezu since the 20th of january 2023

Other priests of this diocese who became bishops
Anastase Mutabazi, appointed Bishop of Kagbayi in 1996
Servilien Nzakamwita, appointed Bishop of Byumba in 1996

References

External links

Catholic-Hierarchy
GCatholic.org

Christian organizations established in 1968
Kibungo
Roman Catholic dioceses and prelatures established in the 20th century